Edward Kennard Rand FBA OCI (December 20, 1871 – October 28, 1945), known widely as E.K. Rand or to his peers as EKR, was an American classical scholar and medievalist. He served as the Pope Professor of Latin at Harvard University from 1901 until 1942, during which period he was also the Sather Professor at the University of California, Berkeley, for two terms. Rand is best known for his 1928 work, Founders of the Middle Ages.

Rand founded the Mediaeval Academy of America, its journal Speculum, and, in addition, served as the president of the American Philological Association (now the Society for Classical Studies) and the Classical Association of New England. At the end of his career, he was a senior fellow at Dumbarton Oaks.

Early life and education 
Born in South Boston on December 20, 1871, Rand was the only son of an established New England family that otherwise consisted of four daughters. He was educated in Watertown, Massachusetts, and, being an overachiever, graduated first in his class among students who had no intention to attend college. Having been in a tight financial situation, he was encouraged by his friends to apply to Harvard and did so by ringing the doorbell of Charles William Eliot, then the president of the university, seeking financial aid. To the "bemused" president, Rand asked, "I would like to go to Harvard; do you have any money?" Upon hearing his request, Eliot personally saw to Rand's admission into Harvard College, where he would go on to graduate as class secretary with an A.B., summa cum laude, and with further honors in the classics, philosophy, Greek, and Latin.

After graduating from Harvard in 1894 and earning his master's degree from the university a year later, Rand sought to follow his father's footsteps in becoming a theologian, enrolling at Harvard Divinity School where he was taught by the philosopher George Santayana. Aimless, he spent three years tutoring fellow students and teaching at a summer school in Maine before finally being invited to join the Classics faculty as a resident scholar at the University of Chicago, where he was allowed to lecture on topics concerning the Middle Ages. During his second year at the university, Rand was given a leave of absence to study at the Episcopal Theological School in Cambridge, Massachusetts. Upon returning to the University of Chicago, he enrolled in a palaeography course taught by Caspar René Gregory, during which time he resolved to attain a PhD at the University of Munich and enter academia.

After traveling through Europe and arriving to study at Munich in 1898, it was there that Rand came under the influence of a number of prominent professors, most notably Ludwig Traube, the granduncle of Eduard Fraenkel, that shaped his postgraduate education. In November 1900, he completed his dissertation, Der dem Boethius zugeschriebene Traktat de fide catholica (The treatise ascribed to Boethius, De Fide Catholica), under Traube's supervision. In the spring of next year, he married Belle Brent Palmer—a native of Kentucky—and later returned to Harvard to assume a position as a Latin instructor.

Academic career 
Beginning with his position as a Latin instructor, Rand would become a tireless professor and academic until the end of his life. He often traveled abroad to assume momentary teaching positions, lecturing at various institutions such as the University of Toronto and the University of Paris. From 1919 until 1920, Rand served two terms as the Sather Professor of Classical Literature at the University of California, Berkeley, delivering lectures on "The History of Classical Culture during the Middle Ages" and "The History of Pastoral Literature". He would, however, spend most of his years teaching at Harvard, where, from 1931 until 1942, he was its Pope Professor of Latin. When Rand finally retired from teaching in 1942, he spent his last years as a senior fellow at Dumbarton Oaks. By his death, he had been an accomplished scholar who founded the Medieval Academy of America, the journal Speculum, Harvard's Servius, and was the president of both the American Philological Association and Classical Association of New England; he had been the author of numerous books and approximately 200 publications, of which more than 100 were articles.

Harvard 

Following his arrival to Harvard in 1901 to teach Latin, Rand gradually rose to the position of assistant professor and, eventually, received a full professorship in 1909. Some of his early work consisted of examining the manuscripts of the philosopher Boethius, who had been the subject of his dissertation, and his Opuscula sacra. However, it was to the early Roman poets that Rand dedicated the majority of his early career. Committed to inflating the status of the poet Virgil, he used "a somewhat audacious mixture of travel and philology" to enhance the appeal of his article, In quest of Virgil's birthplace. Following this, a series of other articles Rand wrote on Virgil were later compiled into a lecture series he gave at Northwestern University, which in turn was used in his work, The Magical Art of Virgil, published in 1931. He also wrote booklets on Horace and Ovid, delivering addresses on them and other Roman writers to the Rice Institute (now Rice University) and the Sorbonne.

At Harvard, Rand spent much of his time writing reviews and articles in academic journals, later succeeding his colleague Clifford Herschel Moore as the Pope Professor in 1931. From his lectures at the Lowell Institute came his most significant work, The Founders of the Middle Ages, which had been first published in 1928.

Having delivered presidential and Phi Beta Kappa addresses at the university, he developed a reputation as a skilled orator and rhetorician.

Awards 
Rand had been a member of the American Philosophical Society, the National Institute of Arts and Letters, the American Academy in Rome, and the Dante Society; as well as a fellow of the British Academy, the Academy of Inscriptions, and the Bavarian Academy of Sciences and Humanities, among others. The Medieval Academy of America established the "Edward Kennard Rand Prize in Medieval Studies" in his honor, awarding a sum of 200 dollars as part of an essay competition in 1928, 1929, and 1930.

During his life, Rand received honorary degrees from multiple universities—including his alma mater, Harvard. The universities of Manchester, Case Western Reserve, and Trinity College Dublin all granted him a Doctor of Letters (Litt. D.), and the University of Glasgow and the University of Pennsylvania awarded him the degree of Legum Doctor (LL.D.). Following his death, the University of Paris awarded him its first post-war honorary doctorate (rentrée solennelle) for his work as a scholar.

In 1939, Rand and his wife were made Chevaliers of the French Legion of Honour. Prior to this, he had also been awarded the Order of the Crown of Italy.

Selected publications

Books 
 Johannes Scottus (Munich, 1906); 
 Dantis Aligherii operum Latinorum concordantiae, ed. with E. H. Wilkins & A. C. White (Oxford, 1912); 
 Boethius: The Theological Tractates, trans, with H. F. Stewart, LCL (New York & London, 1918); 
 Founders of the Middle Ages, Lowell Inst. Lectures (Cambridge, 1928; repr. New York, 1957); 
 Studies in the Script of Tours, 2 vols. (Cambridge, 1929–34); 
 In Quest of Virgil's Birthplace (Cambridge, 1930)
 A Walk to Horace's Farm (Boston & New York, 1930);
 The Magical Art of Virgil (Boston, 1931; repr. Hamden, CT, 1966); 
 The Earliest Book of Tours with L. W. Jones (Cambridge, 1934); 
 The Ancient Classics and the New Humanism (New York, 1938)
 The Building of Eternal Rome (Boston, 1943);

Journal articles 

 "A Romantic Biography of Virgil," CP 18 (1923) 303–9; Ovid and his Influence (Boston, 1925);
 Les ésprits souverains: dans la littérature romaine (Paris, 1936);
 "Horace and the Spirit of Comedy" Rice Inst. Pamphlet 24 (Apr. 1937) 39-117;

Posthumous 
 Cicero in the Courtroom of St. Thomas Aquinas (Milwaukee, 1946);
 Servianorum in Vergilii carmina commentariorum editionis Harvardianae Volumen II, ed. with J. J. H. Savage et al. (Lancaster, PA, 1946).
 Festschrift: Classical and Mediaeval Studies in Honor of Edward Kennard Rand, ed. Leslie Webber Jones (Cambridge, 1938; repr. Freeport, NY, 1968).

References

Bibliography

External links 

 List of books by Edward Kennard Rand
 Image at Dumbarton Oaks
 Portrait at Harvard Art Museums (See also the National Portrait Gallery)
 Collection of papers at Harvard Library

1871 births
1945 deaths
American medievalists
Corresponding Fellows of the British Academy
Harvard College alumni
University of Chicago alumni
Ludwig Maximilian University of Munich alumni
University of California, Berkeley faculty
Harvard University faculty
American Latinists
Recipients of the Order of the Crown (Italy)
Chevaliers of the Légion d'honneur
Latin–English translators
Writers from Boston
Members of the American Academy of Arts and Letters